Duke Gong of Qin (died 604 BC) was from 608 to 604 BC the sixteenth ruler of the Zhou Dynasty state of Qin that eventually united China to become the Qin Dynasty.  His ancestral name was Ying (嬴), and Duke Gong was his posthumous title.

Duke Gong succeeded his father Duke Kang of Qin, who died in 609 BC, as ruler of Qin.  He reigned for five years before dying in 604 BC.  He was succeeded by his son, Duke Huan of Qin.

References

Year of birth unknown
Rulers of Qin
7th-century BC Chinese monarchs
604 BC deaths